Zoya Borisovna Boguslavskaya  (born 16 April 1929) is a Soviet writer, novelist, essayist, playwright, critic, and author of major cultural projects in Russia and abroad. She was born in Moscow to Boris Lvovich Boguslavsky and Emma Iosifovna Boguslavskaya. She studied at the Moscow State Institute of Arts and Institute of History of Art. She has been affiliated with the Association of Women Writers of Russia, the Russian Writers' Union, the Internal Association of Women Writers in Paris, and the Russian Pen Centre.

She married the poet Andrei Voznesensky (1933–2010) in 1964.

Awards
 Russian Individual Triumph and Foundation Prize

References

External links
Official site

1929 births
Possibly living people
Soviet women poets
Soviet poets
Writers from Moscow